The Réti Opening is a hypermodern chess opening whose "traditional" or "classic method" begins with the moves:

1. Nf3 d5
2. c4

The opening is named after Czechoslovakian chess player Richard Réti (1889–1929). The opening is in the spirit of the hypermodernism movement that Réti championed, with the center being dominated from the wings rather than by direct occupation. If White fianchettoes both bishops, castles kingside, and refrains from occupying the center with pawns, the result may be described as the Réti system.

In the Encyclopaedia of Chess Openings, Réti Opening is classified as codes A04–A09, where it is closely associated with the King's Indian Attack.

History

According to Réti, the opening was introduced into master play in the early part of 1923. Réti used the opening most famously to defeat José Raúl Capablanca, the reigning World Chess Champion, in a game at the 1924 New York tournament. Alexander Alekhine played the Réti in the 1920s, but at that time almost any game that began with Nf3 and c4 by White was considered to be the Réti. Réti popularized these moves against all defenses in the spirit of hypermodernism, and as the opening developed it gained structure and a clearer distinction between it and other openings.

Hans Kmoch called the system of attack employed by Réti in the game Réti–Rubinstein, Carlsbad 1923, "the Réti Opening" or "the Réti System". Savielly Tartakower called the opening the "Réti–Zukertort Opening", and said of 1.Nf3: "An opening of the past, which became, towards 1923, the opening of the future."

Classic method: 2.c4 
In modern times the Réti refers only to the configuration Nf3 and c4 by White with ...d5 by Black, where White fianchettos at least one bishop and does not play an early d4.

After 2.c4 (ECO code A09), Black's choices are:
 2...e6 or 2...c6 (holding the d5-point)
 2...dxc4 (giving up the d5-point)
 2...d4 (pushing the pawn)

If Black takes the pawn, then in the same manner as the QGA, 3.e3 or 3.e4 regain the pawn with a slight advantage to White, as Black is left somewhat undeveloped. 3.Na3 and 3.Qa4+ are also good, and commonly played. This variety of White options limits the popularity of 2...dxc4. Trying to protect the pawn with 3...b5?! allows 4.a4! leaving white with a superior position. The alternatives - 2...d4, 2...c6, and 2...e6 - are more common, with the latter two generally leading to a Queen's Gambit type of position, and 2...d4 typically being answered with 3.e3 (sometimes leading to the Blumenfeld Gambit) or the interesting 3.b4!?

Transpositions

After 2.c4 e6, White can play 3.d4, transposing to the Queen's Gambit Declined.

3.g3 Nf6 is the Neo-Catalan Opening.

After 4.Bg2, Black may play ...Be7 or ...dxc4. After 4...Be7, White can play 5.d4, transposing to a Closed Catalan.

Or else White can castle, then Black probably castles as well.

1.Nf3 d5 2.c4 e6 3.g3 Nf6 4.Bg2 Be7 5.0-0 0-0 6.d4 to
1.d4 Nf6 2.c4 e6 3.Nf3 d5 4.g3 Be7 5.Bg2 0-0 6.0-0

With 4...dxc4 to 4.Bg2, White's most common move is 5.Qa4+, and this will not correspond to a 1.d4 line.

After 2.c4 c6, White can play 3.d4, transposing to the Slav Defense.

After 2.c4 c6 3.e3 Nf6, White can play 4.d4, transposing to the Slav Defense.

After 2.c4 c6 3.e3 Nf6 4.Nc3 e6, White can play 5.d4, transposing to the Semi-Slav Defense.

However, White can play 5.b3 instead.

See also
 Flank opening
 List of chess openings
 List of chess openings named after people
 King's Indian Attack
 Tennison Gambit, 1. Nf3 d5 2.e4 
 Zukertort Opening

References

Further reading

Chess openings
1924 in chess